Xu Huan (born 6 March 1999) is a Chinese footballer who plays as a goalkeeper for Jiangsu and the China women's national football team.

International career
Xu was first-choice goalkeeper for China at the 2018 FIFA U-20 Women's World Cup.

References

External links 

1999 births
Living people
Chinese women's footballers
China women's international footballers
Women's association football goalkeepers
2019 FIFA Women's World Cup players